Georg Alexander, Duke of Mecklenburg (27 August 1921 – 26 January 1996) was the head of the House of Mecklenburg-Strelitz from 1963 until his death.

Early life
Georg Alexander was born in Nice, France, the eldest son of the then Count George of Carlow and his first wife Irina Mikhailovna Raievskya (1892–1955). His father assumed the title Duke of Mecklenburg with the style Serene Highness following his adoption by the head of the House of Mecklenburg-Strelitz and his uncle Duke Charles Michael. The adoption of the title was confirmed by the head of the Imperial House of Russia, Grand Duke Cyril Vladimirovich on 18 July 1929 and recognised on 23 December by Grand Duke Friedrich Franz IV of Mecklenburg-Schwerin.

With the death of Duke Charles Michael on 6 December 1934 his father succeeded as head of the Grand Ducal house of Mecklenburg-Strelitz and thus Georg Alexander became heir apparent. The grand ducal family lived at Remplin Castle in Mecklenburg until it was destroyed in a fire in April 1940. During the Second World War both Georg Alexander and his father were interned by the Gestapo for a time.

Post World War II
Duke Georg Alexander studied law in Freiburg before completing his studies in banking. On 18 December 1950 his fathers title was confirmed by the House of Mecklenburg-Schwerin and he then assumed the style of Highness, while his status as head of the House of Mecklenburg-Strelitz was also confirmed. At the same time the Count of Carlow title was abolished.  Georg Alexander lived for a time in Ireland where he managed a number of properties. On returning to Germany he spent twenty years working for an advertising company.

On 6 July 1963 he succeeded his father as head of the Grand Ducal house of Mecklenburg-Strelitz. In 1990 he moved to Mecklenburg and was given an apartment in the former grand ducal residence of Mirow Castle by the local government and he was involved in its reconstruction. Georg Alexander died in Mirow and was succeeded as head of the Grand Ducal house by his son Duke Borwin.

Marriage and children
Duke Georg Alexander was married in Sigmaringen to Archduchess Ilona of Austria (20 April 1927 – 12 January 2011) civilly on 20 February 1946 followed by a religious ceremony on 30 April. Archduchess Ilona belonged to the Hungarian Palatine branch of the House of Habsburg-Lorraine and was a granddaughter of Archduke Joseph August of Austria. Georg Alexander and Ilona had four children before divorcing on 12 December 1974.

Ancestry

References

External links
Photograph of Duke Georg Alexander
Duke Georg Alexander | House of Mecklenburg-Strelitz

1921 births
1996 deaths
House of Mecklenburg-Strelitz
Pretenders to the Mecklenburg thrones
People from Nice
Knights of Malta
German expatriates in France